Mount Hope may refer to:

Antarctica
Mount Hope (Ross Dependency), a hill at the foot of the Beardmore Glacier, Ross Ice Shelf
Mount Hope (Palmer Land), a mountain in the Eternity Range, Palmer Land

Australia
 Mount Hope, New South Wales, a settlement in western New South Wales
 Mount Hope, South Australia, a locality on the Eyre Peninsula, South Australia
 Mount Hope (Victoria), a granite outcrop in northern Victoria

Canada
 Mount Hope, Ontario
 Mount Hope, a community of Arran–Elderslie, Bruce County, Ontario
 Rural Municipality of Mount Hope No. 279, Saskatchewan

New Zealand
 Mount Hope (New Zealand), a peak in the Two Thumb Range in the Canterbury Region

Ottoman Empire 
 Mount Hope, Jaffa, a depopulated American farm

Trinidad and Tobago
 Mount Hope, Trinidad and Tobago, birthplace of Hector Sam

United States
 Mount Hope, Lawrence County, Alabama
 Mount Hope, Walker County, Alabama
 Mount Hope (Alaska), a mountain peak of Alaska
 Mount Hope, San Diego, a neighborhood of San Diego, California
 Mount Hope (Colorado), one of the Collegiate Peaks in Colorado
 Mount Hope (Cheverly, Maryland), a house
 Mount Hope (Hazlehurst, Mississippi), a National Register of Historic Places listing in Copiah County, Mississippi
 Mount Hope, Kansas, a city in Sedgwick County, Kansas
 Mount Hope Plantation House, Baton Rouge, Louisiana
 Mount Hope (MBTA station), a station in Boston, Massachusetts
 Mount Hope, Missouri, an unincorporated community
 Mount Hope (Nevada), a summit in Nevada
 Mount Hope, New Jersey, a section of Rockaway Township, New Jersey
 Mount Hope, New York, a town in Orange County, New York
 Mount Hope, Ohio, an unincorporated community in Holmes County
 Mount Hope, Licking County, Ohio, a ghost town
 Mount Hope, Pennsylvania, birthplace of Ralph E. Urban
 Mount Hope Estate, a property in Manheim Township, Lancaster County, Pennsylvania
 Mount Hope (Rhode Island), a hill in Bristol, Rhode Island
 Mount Hope Farm, an estate in Bristol, Rhode Island
 Mount Hope, Providence, Rhode Island, a neighborhood in northern Providence, Rhode Island
 Mount Hope (Ridgeway, South Carolina), a property in Fairfield County, South Carolina
 Mount Hope, Tennessee, an unincorporated community in Wayne County, Tennessee
 Mount Hope (Falls Church, Virginia), a property 
 Mount Hope (New Baltimore, Virginia), a property in Fauquier County, Virginia
 Mount Hope, West Virginia, a city in Fayette County, West Virginia
 Mount Hope Historic District
 Mount Hope, Wisconsin, a village in Grant County, Wisconsin
 Mount Hope (town), Wisconsin, a town in Grant County, Wisconsin
 Mount Hope Corners, Wisconsin, an unincorporated community in Brunswick, Eau Claire County, Wisconsin

See also
Mount Hope Cemetery (disambiguation)